Robert P. Black (born 1927), a native of Hickman, Kentucky, was the fifth president (1973–1992) of the Federal Reserve Bank of Richmond, the headquarters of the Fifth District of the Federal Reserve System. He was preceded in that position by Aubrey N. Heflin and succeeded by J. Alfred Broaddus (1993–2004) and Jeffrey Lacker (August 1, 2004 – April 4, 2017).

Education and teaching

After cutting short his initial studies at the University of Virginia and serving in the United States Army, Black returned to UVA and earned a bachelor's degree, master's degree, and doctorate in economics. In 1955 he taught for one year at the University of Tennessee. He completed his Ph.D. dissertation in 1954 after beginning his work at the Richmond Federal Reserve Bank.

Career and community activities
At the Fed, Black  became an assistant vice president, vice president, and first-vice president before becoming the president of the FRB Richmond branch.
Black and his two successors as president of the Richmond Fed, J. Alfred Broaddus and Jeffrey Lacker, discussed in an interview for the Richmond Times-Dispatch the changes that occurred in economic trends, the banking community, and the city of Richmond during their tenures at the bank.

According to Charles L. Weise, in April 1978, following President Carter's announcement of an anti-inflation
package, the economist Stephen Axilrod, who was the FRB Staff Director for Monetary and Financial Policy, argued that a reduction in the target range for M1 would add credibility to the administration's
inflation targets, while an increase in ranges "would not appear supportive" of the
program. Robert P. Black, then president of the Federal Reserve Bank of Richmond, urged the Federal Open Market Committee to focus on inflation to take advantage of the fact that "everybody thinks that the administration, Congress, and the Federal Reserve are all committed to fighting inflation as a primary target." The Fed did indeed begin to tighten in the summer of
1978. By August the federal funds rate began to rise at a rate faster than the increase in inflation for the first time since the 1974 disinflation attempt.

In 1990, Black, who was considered an "inflation hawk" testified in support of United States House of Representatives Joint Resolution 409, sponsored by Congressman Stephen Neal, a Democrat from North Carolina, which would have required the Federal Reserve Bank to achieve zero inflation within five years of passage.

He was the first economist to become a Richmond FRB president. As president of the Federal Reserve Bank of Richmond his opinion as an inflation hawk was highly respected, and he was often interviewed about the direction of the U.S. economy.
He served on the board of directors of the Richmond Eye and Ear Hospital, Retreat Health Systems, the Virginia Inter-Government Institute, the Governor's Commission on Defense Conversion and Economic Adjustment, and the Virginia Economic Recovery Commission. He was a member of the advisory boards of the Health Corporation of Virginia, the Center for Advanced Studies of the University of Virginia, and J. Sargeant Reynolds Community College Educational Foundation. He served on the board of governors and executive committee of the Capital Area Assembly and was a board trustee of the Academy for Economic Education and board chairman of Virginia United Methodist Homes.

Publications and speeches
Robert P. Black's contributions to the Federal Reserve Bank of Richmond's Economic Review include:

Jan/Feb, 1991
Reflections on Deposit Insurance
Jul/Aug, 1990
Reflections on the Strategy of Monetary Policy
Jan/Feb, 1990
In Support of Price Stability
Sep/Oct, 1987
The Fed's Anti-Inflationary Strategy: Is it Adequate?
Jul/Aug, 1984
The Fed's Mandate: Help or Hindrance?
Sep/Oct, 1981
Monetary Policy – The Possible and the Impossible

A Federal Reserve president wields influence.

References

1927 births
Economists from Kentucky
Economists from Virginia
Federal Reserve Bank of Richmond presidents
Federal Reserve economists
Living people
People from Fulton County, Kentucky
University of Tennessee faculty
University of Virginia alumni